Donald S. Chisum (born 1944) is an American legal scholar specialized in patent law. His well-known, multi-volume treatise Chisum on Patents was first published in 1978.

Education 
Chisum earned a Bachelor of Arts and Juris Doctor from Stanford University.

Career 
From 1969 to 1996, Chisum worked as a professor of law at the University of Washington School of Law. From 1997 to 2006, he was a professor of law at the Santa Clara University School of Law.

References

External links
 Donald S. Chisum biography at the Chisum Patent Academy

American legal scholars
Living people
Patent law scholars
Stanford University alumni
Stanford Law School alumni
University of Washington School of Law faculty
Santa Clara University School of Law faculty
1944 births